Johannes Stroux (25 August 1886 – 25 August 1954) was a German classicist, scholar of Roman law and organizer of scientific projects and organizations. In 1945 he became rector of the Berlin University and president of the Berlin Academy of Science.

Life and work 
Stroux was born in Haguenau in Alsace-Lorraine, which at this time belonged to the German Empire. He studied in Strasbourg and Göttingen. In 1914 he became professor at the university of Basel (Switzerland), 1922 in Kiel, 1923 in Jena and 1924 in Munich. In 1935 he moved to Berlin as successor of Eduard Norden. In 1937 he became a member of the Prussian Academy of Science.
From 1945 to 1947 he acted as rector of the Berlin University, the later Humboldt-University. Stroux replaced his predecessor Eduard Spranger  as acting rector in October 1945, when control of the university was shifted from the municipal administration of Berlin (Magistrat) to the newly created East-German educational administration (DZV), which was itself controlled by the Soviet Military Administration in Germany (SMAD).

From 1945 to 1951 Stroux was president of the German Academy of Sciences at Berlin (before 1946 called Preussische Akademie der Wissenschaften, then Deutsche Akademie der Wissenschaften zu Berlin).

Organization of science
In different positions Stroux was a part of the international long-term project Thesaurus Linguae Latinae (TLL), the most comprehensive dictionary of the Latin language as well as other similar projects. From 1934 to 1949 Stroux was president of the commission of the German academies for the TLL.

Stroux became 1939 representative of the German academies for the Union Académique Internationale (UAI) and was in same year elected as vicepresident of the UAI.

Political activity
As one of vice presidents of the East-German Kulturbund Stroux became a member of the parliament of the GDR, the People's Chamber.

Scientific work
Stroux published scientific works in the field of Latin language and literature, Roman law, papyrology and epigraphy. One of his most successful works was a book with the title summum ius summum iniuria. It was about the introduction of the concept of equity into Roman Law from Greece through the school of rhetoric.

From 1929 until 1954 he edited the :de:Philologus, an academic journal for classical philology, existing from 1848 until today. In this journal Stroux published also many of his own articles. In the 20th he was one of the editors of the journal Gnomon and later editor of the more popular journal de:Die Antike.

Scientific networking
In the intellectual discussion circle Berliner Mittwochsgesellschaft (1863–1944), member since 1937, he met with scientists like Werner Heisenberg, Ferdinand Sauerbruch, Eugen Fischer and Eduard Spranger and also with some of the people, who planned to overthrow the NS-regime in the 20 July plot of 1944: Johannes Popitz, Ulrich von Hassell, Jens Jessen and General Ludwig Beck.

Memberships and merits
In 1950 Stroux was awarded the National Prize of East Germany. and the Order of Polonia Restituta, 1954 the Patriotic Order of Merit of the GDR. He was elected as member of the Bavarian Academy of Sciences and Humanities (1929) and 1930 elected as corresponding member of the German Archaeological Institute, the Academia dei Lincei in Rome and the Kungl. Humanistiska Vetenskapssamfundet Lund. 1937 he became member of the Prussian Academy of Sciences and the Strassburger wissenschaftliche Gesellschaft, 1954 member of the Polish Academy of Sciences.

Major works 
  De Theophrasti Virtutibus Dicendi. Dissertationsschrift. Teubner, Leipzig 1912.
 Handschriftliche Studien zu Cicero De oratore. Die Rekonstruktion der Handschrift von Lodi. Teubner, Leipzig 1921.
 Summum ius summa iniuria: Ein Kapitel aus der Geschichte der interpretatio iuris. Teubner, Leipzig 1926.
 Nietzsches Professur in Basel. Frommannsche Buchhandlung, Jena 1925.
 Eine Gerichtsreform des Kaisers Claudius. Bayerische Akademie der Wissenschaften, München 1929.
 Die Foruminschrift beim Lapis niger In: Philologus Vol. 86 (1931), p. 460.
 Das historische Fragment des Papyrus 40 der Mailänder Sammlung, In: Sitz.-Ber. d. Dt. Akad. d. Wiss. zu Berlin, Klasse f. Sprachen, Literatur und Kunst, Jahrg. 1952, Nr. 2, Berlin 1953, Nr. 2, 24 S.
 Vom Wesen der Kultur. Auszüge aus einer Ansprache zur Eröffnung der Berliner Universität. In: Aufbau: Kulturpolitische Monatsschrift. Jahrgang 1. Herausgegeben vom Kulturbund zur Demokratischen Erneuerung Deutschlands. Aufbau Verlag, Berlin 1946, S. 111–116.

References

Further reading 
 James F. Tent: The Free University of Berlin. A Political History. Indiana University Press, Bloomington 1988, .
 Jonathan Groß: Stroux, Johannes. In: Neue Deutsche Biographie (NDB). Band 25, Duncker & Humblot, Berlin 2013, S. 582 f. 
 Stroux, Johannes, in: Helmut Müller-Enbergs, Jan Wielgohs, Dieter Hoffmann, Andreas Herbst, Ingrid Kirschey-Feix (Hg.), Olaf W. Reimann (Mitarb.) : Wer war wer in der DDR ? Ein Lexikon ostdeutscher Biographien, 5. Auflage, Ch. Links Verlag, Berlin 2010, Band 2, S. 1293–1294.
 Sören Flachowsky: Der Wissenschaftsorganisator Johannes Stroux an der Berliner Universität 1945–1947. In: Jahrbuch für Universitätsgeschichte. 7/2004. Franz Steiner Verlag, S. 191–214, ISSN 1435-1358
 Siegward Lönnendonker: Freie Universität Berlin. Gründung einer politischen Universität. Duncker & Humblot, Berlin 1988, .
 Wolfgang Kunkel: Johannes Stroux in Memoriam In: Zeitschrift der Savigny-Stiftung für Rechtsgeschichte/Romanistische Abteilung, 1955, 72.Band, S. 514-516;

External links 
 Webpage about Stroux at Humboldt-University Berlin
 Biographical text at the Berlin Brandenburgische Akademie der Wissenschaften (BBAW)
 Website with text about Stroux at the Zentrum Grundlagenforschung Alte Welt at the Berlin Brandenburgische Akademie der Wissenschaften (BBAW)
 Kieler Gelehrtenverzeichnis

1886 births
1954 deaths
People from Haguenau
People from Alsace-Lorraine
Cultural Association of the GDR members
Members of the Provisional Volkskammer
Members of the 1st Volkskammer
German classical scholars
German classical philologists
Classical philologists
German male writers
University of Strasbourg alumni
University of Göttingen alumni
Academic staff of the University of Basel
Academic staff of the University of Kiel
Academic staff of the University of Jena
Academic staff of the Ludwig Maximilian University of Munich
Academic staff of the Humboldt University of Berlin
Members of the Bavarian Academy of Sciences
Members of the Prussian Academy of Sciences
Members of the German Academy of Sciences at Berlin
Recipients of the National Prize of East Germany
Recipients of the Patriotic Order of Merit in gold
Commanders with Star of the Order of Polonia Restituta